Marista may refer to:

 Colégio Marista Dom Silvério, a private school in Belo Horizonte, Brazil
 Colegio Marista Guaynabo, a private school in Puerto Rico, United States
 Marista Hall, also known as Chevrolet Hall, a convention centre in Belo Horizonte, Brazil
 Villa Marista, a prison in Havana, Cuba

See also
 Marist (disambiguation)